Wartislaw I of Świecie (after 1195 – 1227/1233) was a duke from the Samboride dynasty. From 1219 or 1220 until 1227 he was a steward of Świecie and Lubiszewo within the Duchy of Pomerelia. From 1227 until his death between 1227 and 1233, he was a duke of the Duchy of Świecie and Lubiszewo.

History 
He came from the Samboride dynasty and was a son of Mestwin I, and a brother of Swietopelk II, Racibor of Białogarda and Sambor II. He was born after 1195. After the death of his father in 1219 or 1220, he had become the steward of Świecie and Lubiszewo lands in the Duchy of Pomerelia, under the rule of Leszek the White. He had participated in the military campaigns of Leszek. In 1227, after the gaining of the independence of Pomerelia from the Kingdom of Poland, he was made a duke of the Duchy of Świecie and Lubiszewo by his brother, Swietopelk II, the duke of the Duchy of Gdańsk. He had died in Świecie between 1227 and 1233. Following his death, his state was divided between Swietopelk II, who got the area of Świecie, Sambor II, who got the Duchy of Lubiszewo, and Racibor of Białogarda, who got Duchy of Białogarda.

Citations

Notes

References

Bibliography 
 Labuda Gerard, Mściwoj I, Słownik biograficzny Pomorza Nadwiślańskiego, vol. 3, Gdańsk. 1997.
 Bądkowski L., Samp W., Poczet książąt Pomorza Gdańskiego, Gdańsk. 1974.
 Śliwiński B., Poczet książąt gdańskich, Gdańsk. 1997.
 Józef Wójcicki, Dzieje Polski nad Bałtykiem. Warsaw. Książka i Wiedza. 1989

Dukes of Pomerania
Samborides
12th-century births
13th-century births
13th-century deaths
Year of birth unknown
Year of death uncertain